The 1902 VFL season was the sixth season of the Victorian Football League (VFL), the highest level senior Australian rules football competition in Victoria. The season featured eight clubs, ran from 3 May until 20 September, and comprised a 17-game home-and-away season followed by a finals series featuring the top four clubs.

The premiership was won by the Collingwood Football Club for the first time, after it defeated  by 33 points in the 1902 VFL Grand Final.

Premiership season
In 1902, the VFL competition consisted of eight teams of 18 on-the-field players each, with no "reserves", although any of the 18 players who had left the playing field for any reason could later resume their place on the field at any time during the match.

Each team played each other twice in a home-and-away season of 14 rounds. Then, based on ladder positions after those 14 rounds, three further 'sectional rounds' were played, with the teams ranked 1st, 3rd, 5th and 7th playing in one section and the teams ranked 2nd, 4th, 6th and 8th playing in the other. 

Once the 17 round home-and-away season had finished, the 1902 VFL Premiers were determined by the specific format and conventions of the amended Argus system.

Round 1

Round 2

|- style="background:#ccf;"
| Home team
| Home team score
| Away team
| Away team score
| Venue
| Date
|- style="background:#fff;"
| 
| 5.6 (36)
| 
| 14.20 (104)
| Junction Oval
| 10 May 1902
|- style="background:#fff;"
| 
| 3.6 (24)
| 
| 10.17 (77)
| Corio Oval
| 10 May 1902
|- style="background:#fff;"
| 
| 4.10 (34)
| 
| 8.3 (51)
| MCG
| 10 May 1902
|- style="background:#fff;"
| 
| 8.13 (61)
| 
| 0.8 (8)
| Lake Oval
| 10 May 1902

Round 3

|- style="background:#ccf;"
| Home team
| Home team score
| Away team
| Away team score
| Venue
| Date
|- style="background:#fff;"
| 
| 8.10 (58)
| 
| 8.4 (52)
| Brunswick Street Oval
| 17 May 1902
|- style="background:#fff;"
| 
| 7.6 (48)
| 
| 3.7 (25)
| EMCG
| 17 May 1902
|- style="background:#fff;"
| 
| 11.15 (81)
| 
| 3.2 (20)
| Victoria Park
| 17 May 1902
|- style="background:#fff;"
| 
| 2.13 (25)
| 
| 4.9 (33)
| Junction Oval
| 17 May 1902

Round 4

|- style="background:#ccf;"
| Home team
| Home team score
| Away team
| Away team score
| Venue
| Date
|- style="background:#fff;"
| 
| 11.11 (77)
| 
| 5.3 (33)
| Corio Oval
| 24 May 1902
|- style="background:#fff;"
| 
| 5.8 (38)
| 
| 4.11 (35)
| EMCG
| 24 May 1902
|- style="background:#fff;"
| 
| 3.4 (22)
| 
| 7.13 (55)
| Victoria Park
| 24 May 1902
|- style="background:#fff;"
| 
| 6.13 (49)
| 
| 8.12 (60)
| Princes Park
| 24 May 1902

Round 5

|- style="background:#ccf;"
| Home team
| Home team score
| Away team
| Away team score
| Venue
| Date
|- style="background:#fff;"
| 
| 5.14 (44)
| 
| 3.9 (27)
| Corio Oval
| 31 May 1902
|- style="background:#fff;"
| 
| 7.17 (59)
| 
| 6.10 (46)
| Brunswick Street Oval
| 31 May 1902
|- style="background:#fff;"
| 
| 5.5 (35)
| 
| 5.12 (42)
| Junction Oval
| 31 May 1902
|- style="background:#fff;"
| 
| 7.16 (58)
| 
| 5.8 (38)
| EMCG
| 31 May 1902

Round 6

|- style="background:#ccf;"
| Home team
| Home team score
| Away team
| Away team score
| Venue
| Date
|- style="background:#fff;"
| 
| 6.15 (51)
| 
| 11.10 (76)
| Victoria Park
| 7 June 1902
|- style="background:#fff;"
| 
| 4.6 (30)
| 
| 9.14 (68)
| Princes Park
| 7 June 1902
|- style="background:#fff;"
| 
| 5.13 (43)
| 
| 1.3 (9)
| Lake Oval
| 7 June 1902
|- style="background:#fff;"
| 
| 2.13 (25)
| 
| 3.8 (26)
| MCG
| 7 June 1902

Round 7

|- style="background:#ccf;"
| Home team
| Home team score
| Away team
| Away team score
| Venue
| Date
|- style="background:#fff;"
| 
| 7.5 (47)
| 
| 6.10 (46)
| MCG
| 9 June 1902
|- style="background:#fff;"
| 
| 8.14 (62)
| 
| 3.8 (26)
| Brunswick Street Oval
| 9 June 1902
|- style="background:#fff;"
| 
| 6.4 (40)
| 
| 10.4 (64)
| Junction Oval
| 9 June 1902
|- style="background:#fff;"
| 
| 8.11 (59)
| 
| 3.3 (21)
| Victoria Park
| 9 June 1902

Round 8

|- style="background:#ccf;"
| Home team
| Home team score
| Away team
| Away team score
| Venue
| Date
|- style="background:#fff;"
| 
| 4.26 (50)
| 
| 1.8 (14)
| Victoria Park
| 14 June 1902
|- style="background:#fff;"
| 
| 3.6 (24)
| 
| 8.7 (55)
| Junction Oval
| 14 June 1902
|- style="background:#fff;"
| 
| 5.12 (42)
| 
| 7.6 (48)
| Brunswick Street Oval
| 14 June 1902
|- style="background:#fff;"
| 
| 6.7 (43)
| 
| 7.5 (47)
| Corio Oval
| 14 June 1902

Round 9

|- style="background:#ccf;"
| Home team
| Home team score
| Away team
| Away team score
| Venue
| Date
|- style="background:#fff;"
| 
| 12.8 (80)
| 
| 2.7 (19)
| Brunswick Street Oval
| 21 June 1902
|- style="background:#fff;"
| 
| 2.3 (15)
| 
| 4.10 (34)
| EMCG
| 21 June 1902
|- style="background:#fff;"
| 
| 7.19 (61)
| 
| 4.7 (31)
| Victoria Park
| 21 June 1902
|- style="background:#fff;"
| 
| 4.7 (31)
| 
| 2.6 (18)
| Princes Park
| 21 June 1902

Round 10

|- style="background:#ccf;"
| Home team
| Home team score
| Away team
| Away team score
| Venue
| Date
|- style="background:#fff;"
| 
| 10.12 (72)
| 
| 7.7 (49)
| Princes Park
| 5 July 1902
|- style="background:#fff;"
| 
| 6.10 (46)
| 
| 4.10 (34)
| Lake Oval
| 5 July 1902
|- style="background:#fff;"
| 
| 3.9 (27)
| 
| 6.12 (48)
| MCG
| 5 July 1902
|- style="background:#fff;"
| 
| 6.8 (44)
| 
| 12.12 (84)
| Corio Oval
| 5 July 1902

Round 11

|- style="background:#ccf;"
| Home team
| Home team score
| Away team
| Away team score
| Venue
| Date
|- style="background:#fff;"
| 
| 4.9 (33)
| 
| 7.7 (49)
| Junction Oval
| 12 July 1902
|- style="background:#fff;"
| 
| 5.6 (36)
| 
| 6.7 (43)
| Lake Oval
| 12 July 1902
|- style="background:#fff;"
| 
| 6.9 (45)
| 
| 9.14 (68)
| Brunswick Street Oval
| 12 July 1902
|- style="background:#fff;"
| 
| 4.12 (36)
| 
| 4.9 (33)
| MCG
| 12 July 1902

Round 12

|- style="background:#ccf;"
| Home team
| Home team score
| Away team
| Away team score
| Venue
| Date
|- style="background:#fff;"
| 
| 19.13 (127)
| 
| 1.4 (10)
| Victoria Park
| 19 July 1902
|- style="background:#fff;"
| 
| 4.9 (33)
| 
| 1.10 (16)
| Princes Park
| 19 July 1902
|- style="background:#fff;"
| 
| 7.13 (55)
| 
| 6.9 (45)
| Lake Oval
| 19 July 1902
|- style="background:#fff;"
| 
| 5.7 (37)
| 
| 4.9 (33)
| MCG
| 19 July 1902

Round 13

|- style="background:#ccf;"
| Home team
| Home team score
| Away team
| Away team score
| Venue
| Date
|- style="background:#fff;"
| 
| 2.10 (22)
| 
| 5.7 (37)
| Junction Oval
| 26 July 1902
|- style="background:#fff;"
| 
| 8.6 (54)
| 
| 3.9 (27)
| Corio Oval
| 26 July 1902
|- style="background:#fff;"
| 
| 5.6 (36)
| 
| 7.5 (47)
| EMCG
| 26 July 1902
|- style="background:#fff;"
| 
| 4.6 (30)
| 
| 6.8 (44)
| Brunswick Street Oval
| 26 July 1902

Round 14

|- style="background:#ccf;"
| Home team
| Home team score
| Away team
| Away team score
| Venue
| Date
|- style="background:#fff;"
| 
| 12.12 (84)
| 
| 3.4 (22)
| EMCG
| 2 August 1902
|- style="background:#fff;"
| 
| 2.3 (15)
| 
| 7.10 (52)
| Princes Park
| 2 August 1902
|- style="background:#fff;"
| 
| 3.9 (27)
| 
| 9.9 (63)
| Lake Oval
| 2 August 1902
|- style="background:#fff;"
| 
| 5.10 (40)
| 
| 9.7 (61)
| Corio Oval
| 2 August 1902

Sectional Rounds

Sectional Round 1 (Round 15)

|- style="background:#ccf;"
| Home team
| Home team score
| Away team
| Away team score
| Venue
| Date
|- style="background:#fff;"
| 
| 7.5 (47)
| 
| 1.7 (13)
| MCG
| 16 August 1902
|- style="background:#fff;"
| 
| 12.12 (84)
| 
| 5.14 (44)
| Victoria Park
| 16 August 1902
|- style="background:#fff;"
| 
| 3.5 (23)
| 
| 10.12 (72)
| Junction Oval
| 16 August 1902
|- style="background:#fff;"
| 
| 5.6 (36)
| 
| 6.15 (51)
| Corio Oval
| 16 August 1902

Sectional Round 2 (Round 16)

|- style="background:#ccf;"
| Home team
| Home team score
| Away team
| Away team score
| Venue
| Date
|- style="background:#fff;"
| 
| 6.11 (47)
| 
| 3.6 (24)
| Princes Park
| 23 August 1902
|- style="background:#fff;"
| 
| 5.4 (34)
| 
| 13.9 (87)
| Brunswick Street Oval
| 23 August 1902
|- style="background:#fff;"
| 
| 11.11 (77)
| 
| 8.8 (56)
| MCG
| 23 August 1902
|- style="background:#fff;"
| 
| 12.12 (84)
| 
| 5.9 (39)
| Lake Oval
| 23 August 1902

Sectional Round 3 (Round 17)

|- style="background:#ccf;"
| Home team
| Home team score
| Away team
| Away team score
| Venue
| Date
|- style="background:#fff;"
| 
| 5.10 (40)
| 
| 7.4 (46)
| Princes Park
| 30 August 1902
|- style="background:#fff;"
| 
| 16.16 (112)
| 
| 2.11 (23)
| Victoria Park
| 30 August 1902
|- style="background:#fff;"
| 
| 6.10 (46)
| 
| 7.8 (50)
| Brunswick Street Oval
| 30 August 1902
|- style="background:#fff;"
| 
| 10.9 (69)
| 
| 5.5 (35)
| MCG
| 30 August 1902

Ladder

Semi finals

First Semi Final

|- style="background:#ccf;"
| Home team
| Home team score
| Away team
| Away team score
| Venue
| Date
| Attendance
|- style="background:#fff;"
| 
| 9.7 (61)
| 
| 7.9 (51)
| Princes Park
| 6 September 1902
| 8,000
|- style="background:#fff;"

Second Semi Final

|- style="background:#ccf;"
| Home team
| Home team score
| Away team
| Away team score
| Venue
| Date
| Attendance
|- style="background:#fff;"
| 
| 6.12 (48)
| 
| 9.10 (64)
| MCG
| 6 September 1902
| 13,000
|- style="background:#fff;"

Preliminary final

|- style="background:#ccf;"
| Home team
| Home team score
| Away team
| Away team score
| Venue
| Date
| Attendance
|- style="background:#fff;"
| 
| 4.10 (34)
| 
| 6.9 (45)
| MCG
| 13 September 1902
| 26,000
|- style="background:#fff;"

Grand final

Collingwood defeated Essendon 9.6 (60) to 3.9 (27). (For an explanation of scoring see Australian rules football).

Awards
 The 1902 VFL Premiership team was Collingwood.
 The VFL's leading goalkicker in the home-and-away season was Charlie Baker of St Kilda with 30 goals; St Kilda kicked only 64 goals for the year, of which Baker kicked 46.9%, and Baker's proportion of his team's goals is a VFL/AFL record. Including finals, Ted Rowell of Collingwood scored the most goals with 33.

Notable events
 The VFL instituted the amended Argus system to determine the season's premiers.
 St Kilda finished last without a win, their sixth consecutive wooden spoon, and seven games behind second-last Geelong, both VFL/AFL records.
 In each of Rounds 8 and 10, while  champion Albert Thurgood was serving a three-match suspension for striking, one of his team-mates took the field each week under the nom de guerre "Goodthur"; the name was used (in quote marks) in all news reports of the matches. Football historians Michael Maplestone and Stephen Rogers, through a process of elimination, determined that Goodthur was most likely Fred Mann, and official statistics reflect this. 
 Collingwood's Charlie Pannam becomes the first VFL player to play 100 VFL games (at the end of the 1902 season, he had played in 104 of the 106 VFL games that Collingwood had played since the VFL's first round of games in 1897).

Footnotes

References
 Hogan, P., The Tigers Of Old, The Richmond Football Club, (Richmond), 1996. 
 Rogers, S. & Brown, A., Every Game Ever Played: VFL/AFL Results 1897–1997 (Sixth Edition), Viking Books, (Ringwood), 1998. 
 Ross, J. (ed), 100 Years of Australian Football 1897–1996: The Complete Story of the AFL, All the Big Stories, All the Great Pictures, All the Champions, Every AFL Season Reported, Viking, (Ringwood), 1996.

External links
 1902 Season - AFL Tables

Australian Football League seasons
VFL seasons